Overcranked is an Australian punk, rock and metal music festival presented by Rave Magazine. It was first held in 2001. The 2007 edition occurred on 24 March at RNA Showgrounds in Brisbane.

2007 line-up 

The 2007 line-up was:
Helmet
The Butterfly Effect
Frenzal Rhomb (Cancelled)
God Forbid
Horsell Common
Sunk Loto
8 Foot Sativa
Psycroptic
Against
The Hard-Ons
Dreamkillers
Terrorust
Dawn of Azazel
The Rivalry
Pathogen
Lord
Mourning Tide
Minus Life
Rollerball
Repeat Offender
50 Lions
Ruins (Au)
Dyscord
Art Vandelay
Western Decay
City in Panic
Beijing Tank
Dead Letter Circus
Shihad
After The Fall
Sakkuth (pulled pout due to sudden line up change)

2008
Overcranked (2008) was planned for October 2008, but was cancelled.

References

External links
Official website

Recurring events established in 2001
Heavy metal festivals in Australia
Rock festivals in Australia